Puurmani is a small borough in Jõgeva County, Estonia, in Põltsamaa Parish. As of 2011 Census, the settlement's population was 514.

Puurmani contains Puurmani manor, a historical manor recognized by the Estonian government as a cultural heritage object. It is currently occupied by a school.

Writer and translator Asta Põldmäe was born in Puurmani in 1944.

References

Boroughs and small boroughs in Estonia
Villages in Jõgeva County
Kreis Dorpat